The Collection Budé, or the Collection des Universités de France, is an editorial collection comprising the Greek and Latin classics up to the middle of the 6th century (before Emperor Justinian). It is published by Les Belles Lettres, and is sponsored by the Association Guillaume Budé.

Each title of the series includes an introduction, notes and a critical apparatus, as well as a facing-page French translation, comparable to the Loeb Classical Library in the English-speaking world, but with considerably more detailed introductions, apparatus, and critical or explanatory annotations. Some titles even comprise full-scale commentaries. The Greek authors in the series can be recognized by a yellow cover on which Athena's little owl can be seen, the Latin ones by a red one where one finds a she-wolf reminiscent of the Capitoline Wolf. A new series, called "Classiques en poche" and aimed at students, has been added: it reproduces the text and translation of the standard editions, but without the critical apparatus.

The first Budé volume, Plato's Hippias Mineur, was published in 1920. Soon afterwards appeared the first Latin work of the series, namely Lucretius' De rerum natura, edited by Alfred Ernout. More than 800 volumes of the series have been published, with the Greek authors (about 430 vol.) outnumbering the Latin ones (about 370 vol.). Both pagan authors and Church Fathers are included although, for the latter, the Sources Chrétiennes series (Éditions du Cerf, Paris), comprising both Greek and Latin authors, are much more complete.

See also
Bibliotheca Teubneriana
Oxford Classical Texts
Scrittori greci e latini
Loeb Classical Library

External links
Listing of titles: Greek series, Latin series)
Ancient Greek OCR of public domain titles in the Collection Budé at the Lace repository of Mount Allison University: Eschyle par Paul Mazon vol. 1, vol. 2, Platon Oeuvres complètes vol. 13, Ptie.3, Sophocle par Paul Masqueray vol. 2 .
Listing of Collection Budé scans available online, mostly through the Internet Archive: Greek series, Latin series

Dual-language series of texts
Classics publications
Editorial collections